Aldwyn Roberts HBM DA (18 April 1922 – 11 February 2000), better known by the stage name Lord Kitchener (or "Kitch"), was a Trinidadian calypsonian. He has been described as "the grand master of calypso" and "the greatest calypsonian of the post-war age".

Early life
Roberts was born in Arima, Trinidad and Tobago, the son of a blacksmith, Stephen, and housewife, Albertha.  He was educated at the Arima Boys Government School until he was 14, when his father died, leaving him orphaned. His father had encouraged him to sing and taught him to play the guitar, and he became a full-time musician, his first job playing guitar for Water Scheme labourers while they laid pipes in the San Fernando Valley. He became locally popular in Arima with songs such as "Shops Close Too Early", and joined the Sheriff Band as lead singer. He won the Arima borough council's calypso competition five times between 1938 and 1942.

Music career
He moved to Port of Spain in 1943 where he joined the Roving Brigade. He was spotted singing "Mary I am Tired and Disgusted" (aka "Green Fig") with the group by Johnny Khan, who invited him to perform in his Victory Tent, where he met fellow calypsonian Growling Tiger, who decided Roberts should from that point be known as Lord Kitchener. He became known as an innovator, introducing musical and lyrical changes, including frequent criticism of the British government's control of the island. During World War II Kitchener became popular with US troops based on the island, leading to performances in New York. After the end of World War II, the Trinidad and Tobago Carnival took place in early March 1946, during which Kitchener won his very first official Road March title with a catchy calypso leggo called "Jump In The Line".

He toured Jamaica for six months in 1947–48 with Lord Beginner (Egbert Moore) and Lord Woodbine (Harold Phillips) before they took passage on the Empire Windrush to England in 1948. Upon his arrival at Tilbury Docks, Kitchener performed the specially-written song "London Is the Place for Me", which he sang live on a report for Pathé News.

Within two years he was a regular performer on BBC radio, and was much in demand for live performances. He found further success in the UK in the 1950s, building a large following in the expatriate communities of the West Indian islands, and having hits with "Kitch", "Food from the West Indies", "Tie Tongue Mopsy", and "Alec Bedser Calypso", while remaining popular in Trinidad and Tobago.

His prominence continued throughout the 1950s, when calypso achieved international success. Kitchener became a very important figure to those first 5,000 West Indian migrants to the UK. His music spoke of home and a life that they all longed for but in many cases could not or would not return to. He immortalised the defining moment for many of the migrants in writing the "Victory Calypso" with its lyrics "Cricket, Lovely Cricket" to celebrate West Indies cricket team's first victory over England in England, in the Second Test at Lord's in June 1950. This was one of the first widely known West Indian songs, and epitomised an event that historian and cricket enthusiast C. L. R. James defined as crucial to West Indian post-colonial societies.

Kitchener opened a nightclub in Manchester and also had a successful residency at The Sunset in London. Further US performances followed in the mid-1950s. In the 1950s, he also composed "Bebop Calypso".

In 1962, he returned to Trinidad, where he and the Mighty Sparrow proceeded to dominate the calypso competitions of the 1960s and 1970s. Lord Kitchener won the road march competition 10 times between 1963 and 1976, more often than any other calypsonian. For 30 years, he ran his own calypso tent, Calypso Revue, within which he nurtured the talent of many calypsonians. Calypso Rose, David Rudder, Black Stalin and Denyse Plummer are among the many artists who got their start under Kitchener's tutelage. Later he moved towards soca, a related style, and continued recording until his death. Kitchener's compositions were enormously popular as the chosen selections for steel bands to perform at the annual National Panorama competition during Trinidad Carnival. He won his only Calypso King title in 1975 with "Tribute to Spree Simon". He stopped competing in 1976.

Kitchener saw the potential of the new soca phenomenon of the late 1970s and adopted the genre on a string of albums over the years that followed. In 1977 he recorded his most commercially successful song, and one of the earliest major soca hits, "Sugar Bum Bum", which became a big hit for the 1978 Trinidad Carnival season.

In 1993 a campaign was launched for Kitchener to receive the island's highest civilian honour, the Trinity Cross. The government declined but offered him a lesser honour, which he turned down.

Having been diagnosed with bone marrow cancer, Kitchener retired in 1999 after delivering a final album, Vintage Kitch. He died on 11 February 2000 of a blood infection and kidney failure at the Mount Hope Hospital in Port of Spain.  He is buried in the Santa Rosa Cemetery in Arima.

It was always important to Kitchener throughout his career to gain new experiences that could be woven into his material. This led him to performances in Curaçao, Aruba and Jamaica in the early days, and finally to London, when he was already flying high in Trinidad. Kitchener once said: "I have reached the height of my popularity in Trinidad. What am I doing here? I should make a move."

Kitchener is honoured with a statue in Port of Spain. A bust is also on display on Hollis Avenue, Arima, not far from the Arima Stadium.

Family
 
In 1952, he met his wife Elsie Lines. They married in 1953, and lived for a period in Manchester where Kitchener ran a nightclub.  They divorced in 1968.  He later married and had four children (Christian, Kernel, Quweina and Kirnister Roberts) with Valerie Green, and also had a relationship with Betsy Pollard.

Kitchener's son Kernal Roberts is also a performer, playing drums for a soca band in the early 2000s, Xtatik. He was also their musical director and is a composer of multiple Soca Monarch and Road March titles.

Merits

Discography
Calypso Kitch (1960), RCA Victor
Lord Kitchener (1964), RCA Victor
Mr. Kitch (1965), RCA Victor
King of Calypso (1965), Melodisc
Kitch 67 (1966) RCA Victor
King of the Road (1969), Tropico
Sock It to Me Kitch (1970), Tropico
Curfew Time (1971), Trinidad
Hot Pants (1972), Trinidad/Straker's
We Walk 100 Miles with 'Kitch (1973), Trinidad
Tourist in Trinidad with Kitch (1974), Trinidad
Carnival Fever (1975), Trinidad
Sings Calypsos (With And Without Social Significance) (1975), Sounds of the Caribbean
Home for Carnival (1976), Kalinda
Hot and Sweet (1976), Charlie's
Melody Of The 21st Century (1977), Charlie's
Spirit of Carnival (1978), Trinidad
Shooting with Kitch (1980), Charlie's
Kitch Goes Soca - Soca Jean (1980), Charlie's
Authenticity (1981), Charlie's
200 Years Of Mass (1982), Charlie's
Simply Wonderful (1983), Trinidad
The Master At Work (1984), Kalico
The Grand Master (1986), B's
Kitch On The Equator (1986), Benmac
 TrinGhana "Haunting Melodies" (1987), Trinighana - with Little Joe Ayesu
100% Kitch (1987), B's
A Musical Excursion (1989), JW Productions
The Honey In Kitch (1991), MC Productions
Roadmarch & Panorama King Still #1 (1991), JW Productions
Longevity (1993), JW Productions
Still Escalating (1994), JW Productions
 Ah Have It Cork (1995), JW Productions
Incredible Kitch (1996), JW Productions
Symphony On The Street (1997), JW Productions
Classic Kitch (1999), JW Productions

Bibliography
The first biographical work on Lord Kitchener, Kitch: A Fictional Biography of A Calypso Icon, by UK-based Trinidadian author Anthony Joseph, was published in June 2018. The book was shortlisted for The 2019 Republic of Consciousness Prize, the Royal Society of Literature's Encore Award and the Bocas Prize for Caribbean Literature. In 2015 Joseph also presented a 30-minute radio documentary Kitch! for BBC Radio 4, which is available via the BBC Radio 4 website.

See also 
 Jump in the Line (Shake, Señora)
List of calypsos with sociopolitical influences

References

External links
 "Calypso Showcase Lord Kitchener 120391". 5-minute video interview of Lord Kitchener by Alvin Daniell in 1991. 

Kitch, BBC Radio 4 half-hour programme about Lord Kitchener, first broadcast 13 January 2015.
A Tribute to Lord Kitchener

1922 births
2000 deaths
Deaths from multiple myeloma
Calypsonians
Soca musicians
People from Arima
20th-century Trinidad and Tobago male singers
20th-century Trinidad and Tobago singers
Trinidad and Tobago expatriates in the United Kingdom